2012 United States Olympic Trials may refer to:

 2012 United States Olympic Trials (Diving)
 2012 United States Olympic Trials (swimming)
 2012 United States Olympic Trials (track and field)